The Hour of Temptation is a 1936 German mystery film directed by Paul Wegener and starring Gustav Fröhlich, Lída Baarová and Harald Paulsen.

The film's sets were designed by Karl Machus and Otto Moldenhauer.

Cast

References

Bibliography

External links 
 

1936 films
Films of Nazi Germany
German mystery films
1936 mystery films
1930s German-language films
Films directed by Paul Wegener
UFA GmbH films
German black-and-white films
1930s German films